Buya may be:
The Buya dialect of the Masaba language
Buya language (Democratic Republic of Congo), a Bantu language of that is closely related to Nyanga
Laarim language, a Nilo-Saharan language of South Sudan that is also called Buya